The 2013 Vuelta a Murcia was the 29th edition of the Vuelta a Murcia cycle race and was held on 23 February 2013. The race started in Murcia and finished at the Castle of Lorca. The race was won by Daniel Navarro.

General classification

References

2013
2013 in road cycling
2013 in Spanish sport